The Higher Education Commission women's cricket team is a Pakistani women's cricket team, sponsored by Pakistan's Higher Education Commission. They competed in the National Women's Cricket Championship, the Women's Cricket Challenge Trophy and the Departmental T20 Women's Championship between 2011–12 and 2018–19.

History
Higher Education Commission first played in the 2011–12 season, in the National Women's Cricket Championship. They reached the final of the competition in their first season, but lost to Zarai Taraqiati Bank Limited by 181 runs. They went on to reach the final of the competition twice more, in 2015 and 2017, as well as finishing second in the final league stage in 2012–13. Each time, however, they again lost out to Zarai Taraqiati Bank Limited.

They also competed in two Twenty20 competitions, the Women's Cricket Challenge Trophy between 2014 and 2016–17 and the Departmental T20 Women's Championship in 2018 and 2018–19. Each time, they finished fourth in the initial group stage of the competitions, winning just two matches across the five seasons.

Players

Notable players
Players who played for Higher Education Commission and played internationally are listed below, in order of first international appearance (given in brackets):

 Sumaiya Siddiqi (2007)
 Sukhan Faiz (2009)
 Sidra Ameen (2011)
 Iram Javed (2013)
 Anam Amin (2014)
 Sidra Nawaz (2014)
 Aliya Riaz (2014)
 Diana Baig (2015)
 Ghulam Fatima (2017)
 Nashra Sandhu (2017)
 Natalia Pervaiz (2017)
 Fareeha Mehmood (2018)
 Sadia Iqbal (2019)
 Saba Nazir (2019)
 Kaynat Hafeez (2019)
 Tuba Hassan (2022)
 Gull Feroza (2022)
 Sadaf Shamas (2022)

Seasons

National Women's Cricket Championship

Women's Cricket Challenge Trophy

Departmental T20 Women's Championship

Honours
 National Women's Cricket Championship:
 Winners (0):
 Best finish: Runners-up (2011–12, 2012–13, 2015 & 2017)

References

Women's cricket teams in Pakistan